Bertie Edward Wollacott (5 April 1890 – 4 September 1945) was an Australian rules footballer who played with Richmond and Essendon in the Victorian Football League (VFL).

He later served on the Essendon Football Club committee as treasurer for several years.

Notes

External links 

1890 births
1945 deaths
Australian rules footballers from Melbourne
Richmond Football Club players
Essendon Football Club players
People from South Yarra, Victoria